Storeton transmitting station (also commonly known as the Storeton transmitter) is a television transmitter being a member of both the Winter Hill group of transmitters and of the Moel-y-Parc group of transmitter (public service multiplexes only), and an FM radio transmitter, with transmitting antennas affixed to a mast located on Storeton Ridge, Higher Bebington, Wirral, UK (national grid reference: SJ314841). The site is owned and operated by Arqiva. It was originally solely an analogue TV relay of the Winter Hill transmitter and the only Winter Hill relay to carry all five analogue TV channels prior to digital switchover. Construction of the mast was completed in 1980. As of 2009, the TV transmitter serves approximately 45,000 homes.

History
The Storeton site was not an original VHF 405-line transmitter location. For 625-line analogue services on UHF, the relay covered Winter Hill blind spots in low lying areas across the Mersey in south Liverpool and some densely populated areas of Wirral. Prior to digital switchover, all five analogue channels and all six digital multiplexes are broadcast from the site. As a member of the Winter Hill transmitter group, the transmitter is in the BBC North West region and the ITV Granada Channel 3 service licence region, and as a member of the Moel-y-Part transmitter group, the transmitter is in the BBC Wales region and the ITV Wales Channel 3 service licence region. The commercial local TV station Liverpool TV with studios in Toxteth, Liverpool, and the commercial dual-regional radio station Capital North West and Wales with studios in Gwersyllt, Wrecsam, are also broadcast from the site.

Although located in England, the site is within eight miles of the North Wales coast. In coordination with digital TV switchover in North Wales during November 2009, the site commenced service as part of the Moel-y-Parc transmitter group, transmitting the Wales region version of the public service multiplexes to nearby parts of North East Wales, across the River Dee. In official OFCOM documentation the transmitter is listed as Storeton Wales for this purpose. Parts of those areas were previously poorly served with Welsh television services from Moel-y-Parc due to local geography, as natural landforms such as hills can block radio waves from being received, resulting in poor quality radio and television reception or even none at all, depending on the frequencies being used.

The final switchover date for Storeton as part of the Winter Hill transmitter group was 2 December 2009. The official date for Storeton joining the Moel-y-Parc transmitter group with the addition of the three Wales public service multiplexes was 25 November 2009, although there were subsequent changes for those multiplex transmissions on 2 December 2009 with limited publicity.

Since the transition from analogue TV to digital TV broadcasts, the Storeton site is not a relay of either Winter Hill or Moel-y-Parc because it does not receive its signals over the air from the main transmitter sites but is "line-fed" the ten multiplexes by fibre optic cable.

Services available

Analogue radio

The radio transmission licence for the Capital North West and Wales service from both the Storeton transmitter on 97.1 MHz and the Wrecsam-Rhos transmitter on 103.4 MHz, filed under "Capital Wrexham and Chester", was awarded to Marcher Radio Group Limited (a subsidiary of Global Radio Limited and is valid until 4 September 2027

The coverage area of the transmission can be seen on the Ofcom "Wrexham and Deeside FM Measured Coverage Area" document (page 5).

Digital television

The frequency assignments for the Storeton multiplexes (most recent changes were on 12 August 2020) are taken from the UK Digital "700 MHZ Clearance Events - Granada region" document (page 5, "The Storeton Transmitter").

The frequency assignments for the Storeton Wales multiplexes (most recent changes were on 27 February 2019) are taken from the UK Digital "700 MHZ Clearance Events - Wales region" document (page 34, "Storeton Wales", relay of the Moel-y-Parc transmitter).

With the changes on 27 February 2009 for the Storeton Wales multiplexes, when the corresponding frequency of each multiplex became the same as that transmitted from Moel-y-Parc, also accompanied by an increase in effective radiated power from 2.0 kW to 3.0 kw, the Storeton Wales transmissions each became a constituent part of a single-frequency network (SFN), resulting in a significant improvement in reception quality at locations where signals were being received from both sites but where neither was consistently adequate.

Former services

Analogue television transmissions until switchover

Transmission of BBC1 North West, BBC2 North West, and Granada commenced in September 1979.  Transmission of Channel 4 began in July 1983.  Transmission of Channel 5 began from the launch of the Channel 5 service its-self on 30 March 1997.

Digital television transmissions until switchover

Digital television transmissions following switchover

See also
Flint television relay station
Moel-y-Parc transmitting station
Winter Hill transmitting station
West Kirby transmitting station

References

External links
Storeton's entry at the mb21 transmitter gallery
Further information on the Storeton site, featuring some early photographs
Map showing location of Storeton transmitter site and surrounding areas

Buildings and structures in the Metropolitan Borough of Wirral
Transmitter sites in England